One Big Family EP is a four-track extended play (EP) by English band Embrace from their debut album, The Good Will Out (1998). Released on 7 July 1997, and with the song "One Big Family" as the lead track, the EP narrowly missed the top 20 in the United Kingdom, peaking at number 21. "One Big Family" is sung by guitarist Richard McNamara rather than Embrace's usual singer, his brother Danny. In 2011, English artist Templecloud released a cover of the song that reached number 24 on the UK Singles Chart.

The songs "Dry Kids" and "Butter Wouldn't Melt" are on the B-sides compilation, Dry Kids: B-Sides 1997-2005. The B-side  "Dry Kids" gave the name to the collection.

Track listing

Charts

Templecloud version

English artist Templecloud released a cover version of the song, featuring vocals by English singer Hannah Symons. The single was released in the United Kingdom on 24 May 2011 as a digital download. On 29 May 2011 the song entered the UK Singles Chart at number 24.

Music video
The music video for the song was uploaded to YouTube on 24 May 2011.

Track listing

Charts

Release history

References

1997 EPs
Embrace (English band) albums
Hut Records EPs